The proposed Israeli annexation of the West Bank, or parts thereof, has been considered by Israeli politicians since the area was captured and occupied by Israel during the 1967 Six-Day War.

East Jerusalem was the first part of the West Bank to be annexed; it was de facto annexed following its occupation by Israel in 1967, and de jure annexed following the 1980 Jerusalem Law. Annexation of the Jordan Valley, first proposed in the 1967 Allon Plan, was announced by Israeli Prime Minister Benjamin Netanyahu in September 2019 as his plan, subject to the outcome of the September 2019 Israeli legislative election.

Israeli law has been applied to Israeli settlements throughout the West Bank, leading to a system of "enclave law" and claims of "creeping annexation". Annexation of the West Bank would be condemned as illegal by the United Nations and would break international law.

Proposals

Annexation of Israeli settlements

Israel's prime minister, Benjamin Netanyahu, and his center-right Likud party do not have a coherent stance on the status of the West Bank. In 2009, Netanyahu endorsed the two-state solution, but before the April 2019 Israeli legislative election, he stated his intention of unilaterally annexing Israeli settlements in the West Bank. However, since this was a throwaway remark made without addressing the international opposition to such an action, it is unclear whether Netanyahu intends to follow through. On 16 September 2019, in an interview with Israeli Army Radio, Netanyahu said "I intend to extend sovereignty on all the settlements and the (settlement) blocs," including "sites that have security importance or are important to Israel’s heritage," including the settlements in Hebron.

The application of Israeli law in the West Bank settlements has been described by commentators as "creeping annexation".

Annexation of the Jordan Valley

On 10 September 2019 (shortly before the September 2019 Israeli legislative election) Netanyahu announced his government's plan to annex the Jordan Valley, if it won the election. He also reaffirmed his previous pledge to annex all Jewish settlements throughout the West Bank, but said such a move would not be made before publication of the Trump peace plan and consultations with President Donald Trump. According to B'Tselem, 65,000 Palestinians and about 11,000 Israeli settlers live in the area. According to Peace Now, the proposal includes 30 settlements with 12,778 settlers, 18 illegal outposts, 15 Area A and B communities, including 44,175 Palestinians planned to remain under the nominal autonomous rule of the Palestinian Authority, surrounded by annexed territory with access roads, described by Peace Now as "..alarmingly similar to the Bantustan formula in former Apartheid South Africa" and 48 shepherding communities in Area C including 8,775 Palestinians. The area to be annexed is about 22% of the West Bank, 90% of which is in Area C and 20% of the land is Palestinian-owned; the map that Netanyahu displayed of the area to be annexed had several errors, incorrectly noting the location of several settlements and omitting Palestinian villages. Netanyahu's map is only a slightly revised version of the Allon Plan map, with the key difference being that the Palestinians are no longer offered access to the international border with Jordan. Netanyahu said that he had received a green light from the United States' Donald Trump administration. The administration said that there had been no change in United States policy.

The next day, there was international condemnation of the proposal from Palestinians, the Arab League, Saudi Arabia, Jordan, Turkey, the UK and the UN, the latter stating "..that any Israeli move to impose its administration over the Palestinian territory would be illegal under international law." Several Israeli politicians from across the political spectrum and Hebrew media outlets described this announcement as a political stunt for votes, with the former chief of staff and opposition Blue and White MK Moshe Ya'alon saying that Netanyahu had been prepared to evacuate Jordan Valley settlements in 2014.

Annexation of Area C

The West Bank is divided into Area A, Area B, and Area C. Area C contains 60% of the West Bank's area and all Israeli settlements. According to OCHA there are about 300,000 Palestinians in Area C (B'tselem estimates between 180 and 300,000) compared to some 2.8 million in Areas A and B. The Jewish Home party's official position is in support of annexing Area C alone, although some of its MKs support annexation of the entire West Bank. Leading up to the April 2019 elections, the New Right party, led by Naftali Bennett, Israeli foreign minister and Ayelet Shaked, justice minister, advocated for the unilateral annexation of Area C. Bennett estimates that his plan would involve offering Israeli citizenship to some 80,000 Palestinians living in Area C, which contradicts the UN estimate of 297,000 Palestinians in Area C.

Annexation of the entire West Bank
Caroline Glick, a New Right MK candidate in the April 2019 elections, supports annexation of the entire West Bank. Glick supports an application process for Israeli citizenship to Palestinians living in annexed areas, and anticipates that not all Palestinians would desire Israeli citizenship or be eligible.

Annex according to Trump peace plan

Axios cite a "senior U.S. official" as saying that any Israeli annexations must come "in the context of an offer to the Palestinians to achieve statehood based upon specific terms, conditions, territorial dimensions and generous economic support." and that "We are prepared to recognize Israeli actions to extend Israeli sovereignty over areas of the West Bank in the context of the Government of Israel agreeing to negotiate with the Palestinians along the lines set forth in President Trump’s vision." U.S. Ambassador to Israel David Friedman told Netanyahu's aides at a meeting of the U.S.-Israeli mapping committee that is examining potential areas that could be annexed, that "the U.S. wants to implement a peace plan, not an annexation plan".

On 28 May 2020, Netanyahu said he was committed to annexing parts of the West Bank in July once a joint Israeli-U.S. team completes mapping the exact territory based on the conceptual map released by U.S. President Donald Trump's administration. However, the July 2020 annexation plan was later pushed back.

Opinion polling
A 2019 Haaretz poll investigated support for annexation among Israelis. According to the survey, 30% did not know, 28% of Israelis opposed any annexation and 15% supported annexing Area C alone. 27% wanted to annex the entire West Bank including 16% who opposed granting political rights to Palestinians and 11% who favored granting political rights.

Opponents

In 2014, Yesh Atid leader Yair Lapid said that his centrist party would leave the governing coalition and topple the government if any West Bank settlements were annexed. Tzipi Livni, leader of the centrist Hatnuah party, also said that Hatnuah would leave the coalition in the event of annexation. However, both parties support annexation of the settlement blocs after a permanent resolution of the conflict has been negotiated. Yisrael Beytenu supports redrawing the borders in order to keep as many Jews as possible within the Jewish state while transferring some Israeli Arab towns to the Palestinian state, with some Jewish settlements in the West Bank to be annexed to Israel.

The left-wing opposition parties, Labor Party and Meretz, also oppose annexation, as do the Arab parties, which insist on Israeli withdrawal to behind the Green Line. Commanders for Israel's Security, an association of retired Israeli military officers, opposes West Bank annexation.

Anshel Pfeffer, Netanyahu's unofficial biographer stated that the Prime Minister had no intention of going through with the plan, which, he argued, was an electoral move to secure more votes. Long-time Israeli critic of the Israel-South Africa apartheid analogy, Benjamin Pogrund, who was born in South Africa, commented that were the proposal enactment, it would be tantamount to implementing an apartheid regime, and stated that his former assessment would therefore change: '[At] least it has been a military occupation. Now we are going to put other people under our control and not give them citizenship. That is apartheid. That is an exact mirror of what apartheid was [in South Africa].'

International response
In June 2019, the Donald Trump administration indicated that it might not object to the Israeli government's possible annexation of Israeli settlements in the West Bank. Five senators from the opposition Democratic Party introduced a resolution condemning the idea. The Trump administration had earlier recognized Jerusalem as the capital of Israel in December 2018 and recognized the Golan Heights as part of Israel in March 2019. In November, it declared that it did not consider the settlements illegal, but asked Israel to refrain from annexation before the release of the Trump peace plan.

The West Bank is internationally recognized as militarily occupied by Israel, though Israel disputes this and has created nearly 200 Israeli settlements there. According to Yuval Shany, an Israeli annexation would likely be opposed internationally because the plan would violate multiple principles. Firstly, the principle of territorial integrity, that territories should not be acquired by war, as stated in the preamble to United Nations Security Council Resolution 242, in several U.N. resolutions proclaiming the status of the West Bank as occupied Palestinian territory and in the International Court of Justice's advisory opinion on the Wall. Secondly, it would violate the vision of a two-state solution set forth in the Oslo Accords. Thirdly, the permanent and day-to-day control of a civilian population by a foreign power, denying it the right to naturalize or participate in politics, would perpetuate a democratic deficit.

2020
In 2020, on the eve of plans to go forward with a form of annexation, leading figures in the British Jewish establishment, but not the Board of Deputies of British Jews, signed a letter stating that any such annexation would be an 'existential threat' both to Israel and Zionists in Great Britain, and have grave consequences for the Palestinians. Among the signatories were Holocaust survivor Sir Ben Helfgott, historians Sir Simon Schama and Simon Sebag Montefiore; former Conservative foreign secretary Sir Malcolm Rifkind; lawyer Anthony Julius; philanthropist Dame Vivien Duffield; scientist Lord Robert Winston; former MP Luciana Berger; Times columnist Daniel Finkelstein, and novelist Howard Jacobson. 

On June 29, 2020, it was revealed that Netanyahu's coalition partner Benny Gantz would not accept the proposed July 1, 2020 deadline to start annexing the West Bank. Gantz also announced that he would prefer that the Israeli government deal with the COVID-19 pandemic first. Despite not serving as prime minister, it was reported that Gantz's objection cast doubt on when a new deadline could be set. The same day, U.S. sources confirmed that West Bank annexation would not start by the planned July 1 deadline as well.

In midyear a jurist of international law William Schabas filed a request with the International Criminal Court asking that it investigate the architects of the plan, naming Donald Trump, Benjamin Netanyahu, Mike Pompeo and Jared Kushner.

See also
Status of territories occupied by Israel in 1967

References

Further reading

West Bank
Annexation
Politics of Israel
One-state solution